Events in the year 1867 in Mexico.

Incumbents 
 President: Benito Juárez
 Archbishop of Mexico: Pelagio Antonio de Labastida y Dávalos

Governors
 Aguascalientes: Jesús Gómez Portugal
 Campeche: Pablo García Montilla
 Chiapas: 
 Chihuahua: 
 Coahuila: 
 Colima: José Maria Mendoza/Ramón R. De la Vega
 Durango:  
 Guanajuato: 
 Guerrero: 
 Jalisco: 
 State of Mexico:  
 Michoacán: 
 Nuevo León: Manuel Z. Gómez/Jerónimo Treviño
 Oaxaca: 
 Puebla: 
 Querétaro: Manuel Domínguez y Quintanar/Julio M. Cervantes
 San Luis Potosí: 
 Sinaloa: 
 Sonora: 
 Tabasco: 
 Tamaulipas:	 
 Veracruz: 
 Yucatán: 
 Zacatecas:

Events
 January 11 – Benito Juárez becomes Mexican president again in an era called the Restored Republic.
 April 2 – Third Battle of Puebla
 June 19 – A firing squad executes Emperor Maximilian of Mexico.

Births

Notable deaths 
 June 19
Maximilian I of Mexico, 2nd emperor of Mexico, 1864-1867; executed (b. 1832)
Tomás Mejía, general; executed (b. 1820)
Miguel Miramón, substitute president from 1859-1860 (b. 1832),  executed.
 August 21 – Juan Álvarez, interim president of Mexico in 1855 (b. 1790)

External links

References

 
Years of the 19th century in Mexico